Yariv Gideon Levin (born 22 June 1969) is an Israeli lawyer and politician who serves as Deputy  Prime Minister and Minister of Justice. He served as Speaker of the Knesset in December 2022, previously serving that role from 2020 to 2021. He currently serves as a member of Knesset for Likud, and previously held the posts of Minister of Internal Security, Minister of Tourism, and Minister of Aliyah and Integration.

Biography
Levin was born in Jerusalem to Gail and Aryeh Levin, an Israel Prize laureate for linguistics. His mother's uncle, Eliyahu Lankin, was commander of the Altalena ship and member of the first Knesset, representing Herut, whilst Menachem Begin was the Sandek at Levin's circumcision ceremony.

Levin studied at Boyar High School in Jerusalem. During his national service, he joined the IDF Intelligence Corps as an Arabic translator, and later served as commander of an Arabic translation course. In 1995, he published a dictionary of economic terms translated between Hebrew-Arabic-English, Arabic-Hebrew-English, and English-Arabic-Hebrew.

Levin gained an LLB from the Hebrew University, and worked as a lawyer in the field of civil-commercial law. He married Yifat, daughter of former Knesset Member Ya'akov Shamai. They have three children and live in Modi'in.

Political activities
Levin began his public activities in Likud's student faction at the Hebrew University of Jerusalem, where he served as Spokesman and later as deputy chairman of the faction. In 1997, he headed a team that established the Likud branch in Modi'in, and in 2003, he was appointed chairman of the branch. He also represented the opposition to the disengagement plan from Gaza in the supervising committee of the Likud members' poll on the plan, and represented the Members of Knesset who opposed the plan in various legal proceedings.

In 2006, Likud chairman Benjamin Netanyahu appointed Levin to head the Likud committee for oversight of government authorities in order to co-ordinate Likud's opposition activities against the government and its then-Prime Minister Ehud Olmert. Levin filed an appeal to the Supreme Court against the Prime Minister, which resulted in the appointment of a Minister of Social Welfare after a long period of time during which this position was unoccupied. 
 
In addition to his public activities in Likud, Levin took part in establishing the New Young Lawyers Faction, which participated in the elections for the Israel Bar Association institutions for the first time in 1999. Levin, who headed the Faction list, was elected Member of the National Council of the Association and Member of the Jerusalem District Committee representing the Faction. In the National Council elections, Levin was elected Vice Chairman of the Israel Bar Association. Levin was also appointed Head of the Bar Association's salaried lawyers committee. In the 2003 elections for the Bar Association's institutions, the New Young Lawyers Faction increased their power, and Levin was appointed Deputy Chairman of the Bar Association (2003–2005). During his work in the Bar Association, he took part in its legal aide project Sachar Mitzvah, and led reforms in the rules of ethics for lawyers. Levin was among the initiators of the survey examining the conduct of judges in the courtrooms. The Bar Association published the results of the survey.

Activity in the 18th Knesset
In the Likud primaries prior to the 2009 Knesset elections, Levin was elected to represent the central region. He was placed in the twenty-first seat on the Likud list and entered the Knesset as the party won 27 seats. He was re-elected in 2013 after winning seventeenth place on the joint Likud-Yisrael Beiteinu list. On August 3, 2009, Levin was appointed Chairman of the Knesset House Committee. Levin also served as the Knesset representative to the committee for selecting candidates for Attorney General.

Levin chaired the joint committee of the House Committee and the Constitution, Law, and Justice Committee on the Referendum Bill. This bill states that a referendum must be conducted in the event of a plan to relinquish sovereign land. The bill passed second and third readings in November 2010, and became a law.
40 bills proposed by MK Levin during the term of the 18th Knesset were passed on the Second and Third Readings, and were entered in the Statute Book, an all-time record for a Member of Knesset during a single Knesset term.

Activity in the 19th Knesset
In the elections held for the Likud's list of candidates for the 19th Knesset, Levin was elected to the 9th place, placed in the 17th place in the joint Likud – Yisrael Beiteinu list, and was once again elected to serve in the Knesset. On 18 March 2013, Levin was chosen to serve as the head of the coalition and leader of the Likud – Yisrael Beiteinu faction. On 3 June 2013, he was elected again as the Knesset's representative on the committee to locate candidates for the position of Attorney General. Levin serves as the Chairman of the Land of Israel Lobby in the Knesset, along with MK Orit Strock. Levin also serves as the Knesset representative to the committee for selecting candidates for Attorney General.

28 bills proposed by MK Levin have been approved thus far in the 19th Knesset, passing a second and third reading and entering into law.

In February 2014, a bill, sponsored by Levin, was approved that officially recognized Christian Arabs as a distinct legal minority in Israel.

Despite being affiliated as a Secular Jew himself, Levin criticized Reform Jews, especially those living in the United States, after the Israeli government's decision to expand the egalitarian section of the Western Wall. Levin said that "Reform Jews in the United States are a dying world. Assimilation is taking place on a vast scale. They are not even tracking this properly in their communities. It is evidenced by the fact that a man who calls himself a Reform rabbi stands there with a priest and officiates at the wedding of the daughter of Hillary Clinton and no one condemns it, thereby legitimizing it."

Activity in the 20th Knesset
Prime Minister Netanyahu appointed Levin as Minister of Public Security and Minister of Tourism after the 2015 elections. He gave up his Public Security portfolio after 11 days, when Netanyahu appointed Gilad Erdan to the post. On 24 December 2018, he was appointed as Minister of Aliyah and Integration.

Activity in the 23rd Knesset 
Following the formation of the Thirty-fifth government of Israel, Levin was elected Speaker of the Knesset on 17 May 2020 with 71 votes in favor. He was replaced in the twenty-fourth Knesset by Mickey Levy on 13 June 2021.

Activity in the 25th Knesset 
Following the 2022 election, Levin was elected Speaker on 13 December with 64 votes in favor. He announced his resignation as speaker on 27 December, which came into effect on 29 December.

Minister of Justice (2022-present) 
After Israel's right-wing bloc emerged victorious at the 2022 Israeli legislative elections, Levin was appointed Deputy Prime Minister and Minister of Justice in the incoming thirty-seventh government of Israel.

in January 2023, Levin unveiled a governmental plan for a legislative overhaul of the country's judicial system. The plan seeks to weaken the Supreme Court of Israel by granting the government effective control over the Judicial Selection Committee, prohibiting the court from ruling on the constitutionality of certain laws and regulations, and granting the Knesset the power to override any court ruling by a simple majority.

Levin's proposed changes to the judicial system sparked intense controversy, with some opposition leaders arguing that the plan amounts to an attempt at regime change and anti-government protests commencing shortly after the plan's unveiling. Levin fiercely defended the plan, frequently arguing that the supreme court's power to strike down legislation is un-democratic, having stated that "time after time, people who we didn’t elect decide for us".

Political opinions
Levin holds hawkish views with respect to the Israeli–Palestinian conflict. He opposes the creation of a Palestinian State, and believes in the right of Jews to remain in all parts of the land of Israel.

Levin often criticizes the court system in Israel, claiming a small elite has taken over the system and tries to use it in order to define the values Israel lives by.

References

External links

1969 births
Living people
Hebrew University of Jerusalem Faculty of Law alumni
Israeli lawyers
Jewish Israeli politicians
Likud politicians
Members of the 18th Knesset (2009–2013)
Members of the 19th Knesset (2013–2015)
Members of the 20th Knesset (2015–2019)
Members of the 21st Knesset (2019)
Members of the 22nd Knesset (2019–2020)
Members of the 23rd Knesset (2020–2021)
Members of the 24th Knesset (2021–2022)
Members of the 25th Knesset (2022–)
Ministers of Public Security of Israel
Ministers of Tourism of Israel
Lawyers from Jerusalem
Secular Jews
Speakers of the Knesset